Joseph James Britton (18 February 1911 – 28 March 1995) was an Australian politician.

He was born in Launceston. In 1959 he was elected to the Tasmanian House of Assembly as a Labor member for Braddon. He was defeated in 1964. After unsuccessfully running in 1972, he was elected in a countback in 1975 following Eric Reece's resignation. He retired the following year.

References

1911 births
1995 deaths
Members of the Tasmanian House of Assembly
Australian Labor Party members of the Parliament of Tasmania
20th-century Australian politicians